Boss: Born to Rule is a 2013 Indian Bengali-language action thriller film directed by choreographer Baba Yadav, making his directorial debut. It is a remake of the 2012 Telugu film Businessman which was directed by Puri Jagannadh and starred Mahesh Babu and Kajal Agarwal in lead roles. The film was jointly produced by Reliance Entertainment and Grassroot Entertainment and distributed by Jalsha Movies Production. The film stars Jeet and Subhashree Ganguly in lead roles, while Chiranjeet and Rajatava Dutta appear in prominent roles. The film have stunts designed by Rocky Rajesh and lyrics written by Prosen. The story revolves around a rookie named Surya (Jeet), who lands in the country’s commercial capital with the intention to become a Mafia Don. In the process, he falls for Rusha (Subhashree Ganguly), the daughter of the police commissioner.  Despite getting mixed reviews, it got blockbuster results at the box office. A sequel titled, Boss 2: Back To Rule was released on 23 June 2017. The shooting of the film has started from January 2017.

Plot 

At a time when Mumbai Police headed by Police Commissioner announce that the much dreaded Mafia Raj is completely wiped out in the city and there are no under world Bhais in Mumbai, a rookie named Surya lands in the country’s commercial capital with an intention to become a Mafia Don. His friend receives him and brings him to Dharavi. He offers him shelter and tells him that he would soon fetch him a job so that he can settle down in life. But Surya wants to carve an identity for himself, by reorganizing Mumbai's Mafia Raj and eventually rule Mumbai. He then mocks as a cop and gets his first bounty, and then he forms a gang of his own. Surya meets up with a local politician Gopi, who is in trouble and offers him help. Surya begins recruiting criminals and gangsters in Mumbai and starts to extort people for money. He slowly gains momentum and, in the process, becomes popular and feared among the people.

Meanwhile, he also knowingly tries to get romantically involved with Rusha, the daughter of the police commissioner. In the process, he actually falls for the girl and tries for her acceptance. In the course of the film, Surya becomes popular among Dharavi's locals. He comes across as an extortionist, a baron, a philanthropist, and an entrepreneur. His friendship with Gopi gets stronger, and so does his political connections. Surya sets up a company named "Surya Exports & Imports," which would act as a front for the organized crime that they indulge in. Surya reveals his plan to grow his network of organized crime all over India. He begins to set up branch offices for "Surya Exports & Imports" in all major cities, towns, and villages all over India. He recruits local gangsters for staff and begins to forcefully collect a two per cent tax on every contract done in that area. Eventually, Surya grows to be a billionaire and later reveals to the police commissioner that he never wanted money but only power. He claims that he believes in war but not morality and that the crime rate dropped significantly after he started to recruit all the gangsters. He also states that he wants to rid India of crime and help the needy.

Surya also helps Gopi to become the Mayor of Mumbai by defeating Arun Ghokle, who is backed up by Rajsekhar Sinha, a powerful national politician. Eventually, Arun Ghokle goes against Rajsekhar and talks to the police about Rajsekhar's illegal activities. Rajsekhar kills the police commissioner, and Rusha becomes devastated by it. Surya reveals to her that he was an American born Indian who loses his philanthropist Non-resident Indian father at an early age. His parents were the victims of political corruption and were cheated and killed by Rajsekhar. This incident and the attitude of people towards an orphan while growing up made him hate the society.

In his pursuit of power and achieving his goal of getting India rid of the crime, he shifts his attention towards the upcoming Indian parliament elections. He, with the help of Gopi, meets up with Guru Govind Patel, head of the opposition party. He makes a deal with him and offers him INR350 billion (US$5.5 billion) for election campaigning and also promises him that he would make him the prime minister of India. Surya uses the money and starts to make an impact on the elections. He spends millions on every constituency in India and also makes Rajsekhar unable to contest in the elections. After knowing that Rajsekhar Sinha has kidnapped Rusha to seek revenge on him, he fights of the Rajsekhar's goons and eventually kills him and saves Rusha. It is shown at the end that he had successfully installed Guru Govind Patel as the prime minister of India and is seen with Rusha, who accepts his love.

Cast 
 Jeet as Surya 
 Subhashree Ganguly as Rusha Roy
 Chiranjeet as Police Commissioner Vinayak Roy, who wants to remove the underworld syndicate from Mumbai
 Rajatava Dutta as Rajsekhar Sinha, who tends to be the Prime Minister of India
 Supriyo Dutta as Chief Minister Gopinath Shivalkar
 Biswajit Chakraborty as Mumbai Mayor Arun Gokhle
 Biswanath Basu as Shibcharan Chowdhury
 Sanju Mandal as Kaalia
 Joy Badlani as Shailendra Singh
 Bhashkar Dev as Inspector Bharath Patnaik
 Somnath Kar as Shakib
 Yusuf Chishti as the rich spoilt kid

Awards and nominations

Reception

Critical response 
The film received mixed-to-positive reviews from critics.
Jaya Biswas of The Times of India reviewed "Jeet looks slim and fit. He can dance, fight and emote as well. His performance — as a shrewd and confident guy, who couldn't care less about scruples in life — is worthy of mention. Though Subhashree adds to the glamour quotient, she disappoints in the acting department. She looks fabulous in smart off-shoulder tops but her chemistry with Jeet is non-existent. Our hero's one-liner seems quite pertinent here: "Raja thakle tar rani ke toh thakte i hobe". Veteran actor Chiranjeet is effective as the police commissioner. Rajatava, Supriyo and Biswajit do their bit as crooked politicians — nothing we haven't seen before. But a dull storyline and a weak script ruin the show. Too many characters create confusion. The songs fail to impress and the lyrics are not up to the mark. But cut out the nitpicking and nothing should stop Jeet fans from joining their favourite star in action."

Box office 
Boss: Born to Rule was Jeet's first film to get an all-India release. Boss garnered  on its first day after release, beating the first day collections of Dev's Khoka 420. Boss, however, couldn't beat the weekend collections of Khoka 420(which was ) and made  in its first weekend. The film grossed .

Soundtrack 

Arijit Singh won Best Playback Singer (Male) at the Filmfare Awards East for the song "Mon Majhi Re", which had an overwhelming response from all over Bengal. The soundtrack was released on 13 July 2017.

Sequel 

Following up on the success of Boss, it was announced in September 2013, that the team of Jeet and Baba Yadav have decided to create a "Part II" sequel film with plans for distribution abroad. The sequel is titled Boss 2: Back To Rule and retains many of the same cast and crew of the original film. Unlike the first film, which was a remake of another film, Boss 2 is an original film. The sequel is also an Indo-Bangladesh joint venture, being co-produced by Bangladesh's Jaaz Multimedia. The shooting of the film was started from January 2017, and the film was released on 23 June in Bangladesh and in July in India.

References

External links 
 
 

Bengali-language Indian films
2010s Bengali-language films
2013 films
Bengali remakes of Telugu films
Indian crime action films
Films scored by Jeet Ganguly
Films about organised crime in India
2013 masala films
Indian gangster films
2013 crime action films
Reliance Entertainment films
Films directed by Baba Yadav